Pål Johan Karlsen (27 June 1975) is a Norwegian writer, editor and psychologist. He reports on recent findings in social science, psychology and neuroscience for Norwegian newspaper Aftenposten.

Affiliated with the University of Tromsø, he has been an editor at the Journal of the Norwegian Psychological Association since 2007. At the end of 2013, he launched the Open Access journal Scandinavian Psychologist and the website Psykologisk.no together with the Norwegian Society of Psychological Science.

He holds an MA in psychology from New York University, where he was a Fulbright Scholar. He also holds a PhD in psychology from the University of Oslo.

Bibliography

 2002 – Daimler "Daimler" (adult fiction)
 2004 – Slik får du bedre hukommelse "How to improve your memory" (nonfiction)
 2008 – Hva er hukommelse "What is memory" (nonfiction)
 2012 – Psykologi: Inngangsporten "Psychology: The introduction" (academic textbook)
 2015 – Psykologi i et nøtteskall "Psychology in a nutshell" (nonfiction)
 2015 – The Stormwater Drains in Canberra (adult fiction)

References

External links
Official website
Publisher´s website
Scandinavian Psychologist

1975 births
People from Bodø
Norwegian male writers
Norwegian editors
Norwegian psychologists
University of Oslo alumni
Academic staff of the University of Tromsø
Living people